The Women's Amstel Gold Race is the women's event of the Amstel Gold Race, the most important annual road cycling event in the Netherlands. Held in mid-April, it is organized on the same day as the men's race at approximately half the distance. Like the men's event, the race starts in Maastricht and finishes in Berg en Terblijt, Valkenburg. It features 17 categorized climbs, including four ascents of the Cauberg.

History

Pioneering years and reboot
From 2001 to 2003, three editions of the Amstel Gold Race for elite women were held. In 2003, it was part of the UCI Women's Road World Cup. The race started in Maastricht 30 minutes after the men's. It was run over 114 km, taking in nine climbs and similarly finishing on top of the Cauberg. The race was discontinued after the third edition, because organization on the same day and on largely the same roads as the men's race was considered too difficult on the irregular circuits.

The event was rebooted in 2017 after a 14-year hiatus. Olympic road race champion Anna van der Breggen won the race with an attack at 8 km from the finish. Chantal Blaak won the 2018 race as ruling world champion.

Holland Hills Classic

During the discontinuation of the Amstel Gold race for women, another women's elite professional cycling race, the Holland Hills Classic, was held in Limburg. The first years the race was held in August, before moving to the spring in 2011. It had a similar route as the Amstel Gold Race and, likewise, finished in Berg en Terblijt, Valkenburg. It was organized by the Stichting Holland Ladies Tour, which also organizes the Holland Ladies Tour. The race was a 1.1 UCI event and was discontinued after the 2016 edition when it became apparent there would be a rebooted Amstel Gold Race in 2017. Marianne Vos won the event three times.

Winners

Wins per country

References

External links

 
UCI Women's World Tour races
Recurring sporting events established in 2001
Cycle races in the Netherlands